KFF Elbasani is an Albanian women's football club based in Elbasan.

References 

Football clubs in Albania
Women's football clubs in Albania
Association football clubs established in 2013
Sport in Elbasan
2013 establishments in Albania